USS Pargo (SSN-650), a Sturgeon-class attack submarine, was the second ship of the United States Navy to be named for the pargo, also known as the red snapper, a fish of the genus Lutjanus found in the West Indies.

Construction and commissioning
The contract to build Pargo was awarded to the Electric Boat Division of General Dynamics Corporation in Groton, Connecticut, on 26 March 1963 and her keel was laid down there on 3 June 1964.  She was launched on 17 September 1966, sponsored by Mrs. Jean Gordon Holloway (née Hagood), the wife of retired Admiral James L. Holloway, Jr. (1898–1984), and commissioned on 5 January 1968 with Commander Steven A. Whitein command.

Service history

1960s
Assigned to Submarine Development Group 2 with her home port at New London, Connecticut. Pargo was altered for acoustics at Groton then was involved in acoustic trials that resulted in alterations to all U.S. submarines. After acoustic trials the Pargo spent much of its time doing arctic research, surfacing at the north pole several times. Pargo participated in the search for the missing attack submarine  from 27 May to 7 June 1968. She spent the rest of 1968 conducting various trials in the Caribbean Sea and off New London.

1970s
The Pargo made her 650th dive on 29 March 1978.

1980s
The "Pargo" entered dry dock at Puget Sound Naval Shipyard (Bremerton, WA) in February 1985 for an 18-month overhaul. 
30 months later the boat was back in service, having upgrades to all non-nuclear systems.

1990s
The "Pargo" conducted the first civilian oceanographic submarine cruise of the Arctic Ocean in 1993.

Decommissioning and disposal
Pargo was decommissioned on 14 April 1995 and stricken from the Naval Vessel Register the same day. Her scrapping via the Nuclear-Powered Ship and Submarine Recycling Program at Puget Sound Naval Shipyard at Bremerton, Washington, began on 1 October 1994 and was completed on 15 October 1996.

Awards
Navy Unit Citation – 4 awards (1969, 1970, 1973, 1975)
Meritorious Unit Commendation – 4 awards (1971, 1981, 1991, 1994)
Navy "E" Ribbon – 1 award (1980)
Navy Expeditionary Medal
National Defense Service Medal – 2 awards
Sea Service Deployment Ribbon

References 

NavSource Online: Submarine Photo Archive Pargo (SSN-650)

External links

 USS Pargo Association

 

Ships built in Groton, Connecticut
Sturgeon-class submarines
Cold War submarines of the United States
Nuclear submarines of the United States Navy
1966 ships